Robert Mandrou (31 January 1921 – 16 June 1984), was a  French historian, one of the members of the Annales School and the secretary to its journal Annales d'Histoire Economique et Sociale ("Annals of economic and social history") . He was also, with Georges Duby one of the pioneers of what Annaliste historians in the 1970s and 80's came to call the "history of mentalities".

Selected works
 Histoire de la civilisation française (2 vol. with Georges Duby), Paris, Armand Colin, 1958. (published in English as A History of French Civilization, Random House, 1964)

Notes and references

1921 births
1984 deaths
Place of birth missing
20th-century French historians
French male non-fiction writers
Lycée Voltaire (Paris) teachers
20th-century French male writers